Herbjørn Nilson Gaustå also Herbjorn Gausta (June 16, 1854 – May 22, 1924) was an American artist who is best known for his landscapes, portraits, and scenes from rural settings. He left an early record of immigrant life in his portraits and paintings and helped establish a place for art in the culture of Norwegian-Americans.

Biography

Gausta was born on the Gausta farm in Mæl parish in the municipality of Tinn in Telemark county, Norway. In 1867, Gausta immigrated to America with his parents and four sisters, settling on a farm near Harmony, Minnesota. Gausta entered a training program for parochial school teachers at Luther College in 1872. He left for Europe three years later on a stipend provided by the community of Decorah, Iowa under the leadership of Ulrik Vilhelm Koren. Gausta studied at Knud Bergslien's Academy of Art in Oslo and also attended the Academy of Fine Arts, Munich.
 

He returned to Decorah and taught at Luther College during the 1886-1887 academic year. He lived with the U.V. Koren family at the Washington Prairie parsonage while teaching at Luther College. Subsequently, Gausta based his studio in Minneapolis, MN, where he supported himself principally by painting portraits of prominent Norwegian-Americans and  producing altarpieces for Lutheran churches. His landscapes and genre paintings were well-received, particularly those painted during his early years. There are almost 60 paintings by Gausta in the Fine Arts Collection of Luther College.

Gausta was good friends with the entertainers Eleonora and Ethel Olson. Yust For Fun, a book published by the Olson Sisters in 1925, had two illustrations that he may have drawn.

Gausta taught at the University of Minnesota until his death in 1924. Gausta, who never married, was buried in Harmony, Minnesota, alongside a 16-foot granite monument which was erected in his honor in 1927.

Further reading
Nelson, O.N. History of the Scandinavians and Successful Scandinavians in the United States. (O.N. Nelson & Co. Minneapolis, MN. 1900)
Nelson, Marion Paintings by Minnesotans of Norwegian Background, 1870-1970 (Minnesota Historical Society and Norwegian-American Historical Association. Northfield, MN. 2000)
 Jacobson, J.N. Herbjørn Gausta, (Telesoga. Vol. 2. 1950)
Hansen, Carl G.O. My Minneapolis. (Minneapolis, MN: Standard Press, 1956) pp. 170–173.
Anderson, Kristin M. Norwegian-American Altar Painting, 1880-1920. (M.A. Thesis, Luther Northwestern Theological Seminary, 1987)

References

External links
Online book
My Minneapolis: Nasjonalbiblioteket 
52. Herbjørn Gausta
Articles
"Bumping into a sliver of church history"
Herbjørn Gausta: U. S. Department of State
Paintings
Setting the Trap
Farm Landscape
Fine Arts Collection at Vesterheim
Washington Prairie Parsonage: pp. 78–79.
Exhibition at U. S. Embassy in Oslo: pp. 26–27.
Luther College Fine Arts Collection
Selected portraits
1882 Jacob D. Jacobsen
1883 Diderrike Brandt
1885 Herman Amberg Preus
1885 Caroline Keyser Preus
Photos
Herbjørn Gausta with Eleonora and Ethel Olson
Herbjørn Gausta: Norwegian American Hall of Fame
Drawing by Herbjørn Gausta
Aslaug in Telesoga 1919
Drawings attributed to Herbjørn Gausta
The Fire At Kniperud's in Yust For Fun 1925
The Old Sogning Woman in Yust For Fun 1925

1854 births
1924 deaths
Academy of Fine Arts, Munich alumni
American artists
American Lutherans
Norwegian emigrants to the United States
People from Harmony, Minnesota
People from Telemark
University of Minnesota faculty